Saidiya Hartman (born 1961) is an American writer and academic focusing on African-American studies. She is currently a University Professor at Columbia University.

Early life 
Hartman was born in 1961 and grew up in Brooklyn, New York. She earned a B.A. from Wesleyan University and Ph.D. from Yale University.

Career 
Hartman worked at the University of California, Berkeley, from 1992 to 2006 in the Department of English and African American Studies. In 2007 Hartman joined the faculty of Columbia University, specializing in African-American literature and history. In 2020 she was promoted to University Professor at Columbia.

Hartman has been a Fulbright, Rockefeller, Whitney Oates, and University of California President's Fellow and was awarded the 2007 Narrative Prize from Narrative Magazine and the Gustav Myers Award for Human Rights. Hartman won a MacArthur “genius” grant in 2019. She was named a fellow of the American Academy of Arts and Sciences in 2022.

Fields of interest
Hartman's major fields of interest are African-American and American literature and cultural history, slavery, law and literature, gender studies, and performance studies. She is on the editorial board of the journal Callaloo.

She is the author of the influential Scenes of Subjection: Terror, Slavery, and Self-Making in Nineteenth-Century America (Oxford University Press, 1997), Lose Your Mother: A Journey Along the Atlantic Slave Route (Farrar, Straus and Giroux, 2007), and Wayward Lives, Beautiful Experiments: Intimate Histories of Social Upheaval (W. W. Norton, 2019). Hartman's "essays have been widely published and anthologized."

Theoretical concepts
Hartman introduces the idea of "critical fabulation" in her article "Venus in Two Acts," although she could be said to be engaged in the practice in both of her full-length books, Scenes of Subjection and Lose Your Mother. The term "critical fabulation" signifies a writing methodology that combines historical and archival research with critical theory and fictional narrative. Critical fabulation is a tool that Hartman uses in her scholarly practice to make productive sense of the gaps and silences in the archive of trans-Atlantic slavery that absent the voices of enslaved women. Hartman writes: "I think of my work as bridging theory and narrative. I am very committed to a storied articulation of ideas, but working with concepts as building blocks enables me to think about situation and character as well as my own key terms."

Hartman also theorizes the "afterlife of slavery" in Lose Your Mother: A Journey Along the Atlantic Slave Route. The "afterlife of slavery" can be characterized by the enduring presence of slavery's racialized violence still present in contemporary society. Hartman outlines slavery's imprint on all sectors of society as evidenced in historical archives that may or may not exist. Hence, the archive lives on through the social structure of the society and its citizens. Hartman describes this process in detail in Lose Your Mother: "I wanted to engage the past, knowing that its perils and dangers still threatened and that even now lives hung in the balance. Slavery had established a measure of man and a ranking of life and worth that has yet to be undone. If slavery persists as an issue in the political life of black America, it is not because of an antiquarian obsession with bygone days or the burden of a too-long memory, but because black lives are still imperiled and devalued by a racial calculus and a political arithmetic that were entrenched centuries ago. This is the afterlife of slavery—skewed life chances, limited access to health and education, premature death, incarceration, and impoverishment. I, too, am the afterlife of slavery." Hartman went back to Africa to learn more about slavery and came back having learned more about herself.

Hartman further fleshes out the afterlives of slavery through the ways in which photographic capture and enclosure spills into domestic spaces. Hartman exposes the limits of such capture as she describes the hallway as a regulative, yet intimate space. She writes, “It is inside but public…The hallway is a space uneasy with expectation and tense with force of unmet desire. It is the liminal zone between the inside and outside for the one who stays in the ghetto; the reformer documenting the habitat of the poor passes through without noticing it, failing to see what can be created in cramped space, if not an overture, a desecration, or to regard our beautiful flaws and terrible ornaments."

Contributions to the understanding of slavery
Hartman has made literary and theoretical contributions to the understanding of slavery. Her first book, Scenes of Subjection: Terror, Slavery, and Self-Making in Nineteenth-Century America, is an examination of, among other topics, the intersection of slavery, gender, and the development of progressivism in the United States through the exploration of blank genealogies, memory, and the lingering effects of racism. Working through a variety of cultural materials –- diaries, journals, legal texts, slave and other narratives, and historical song and dance—Hartman explores the precarious institution of slave power. Her second book, Lose Your Mother: A Journey Along the Atlantic Slave Route (2007), confronts the troubled relationships among memory, narratives, and representation. She concentrates on the "non-history" of the slave, the manner in which slavery "erased any conventional modality for writing an intelligible past". By weaving her own biography into a historical construction, "she [also] explores and evokes the non-spaces of black experience—the experience through which the African captive became a slave, became a non-person, became alienated from personhood. Through these experiences, came the title: "Because of the slave trade you lose your mother, if you know your history, you know where you come from. To lose your mother was to be denied your kin, country and identity. To lose your mother was to forget your past" (85).

Hartman's contributions to understanding slavery caught the attention of UC Irvine's Frank B. Wilderson III, well known for setting groundwork and coining the phrase "Afro-pessimism". This criticism examines unflinching paradigmatic analysis on the structures of modernity produced by slavery and genocide. While he considers her Scenes of Subjection as Afro-pessimist scholarship, Hartman herself has not called it so.

Contributions to historical archiving
Hartman has contributed insight into the forms and functions of the historical archive, providing both pointed critiques of and methodological guides to approaching the archive in scholarly work. In both Scenes of Subjection and Lose Your Mother, Hartman accesses and critically interrogates the historical archive. In the case of the latter, much of this is done through the combined re-reading of historical narratives of slavery and through the connection of these narratives to the physical location of Ghana. Hartman, who centers much of her interrogation of slavery's archive on Elmina Castle, inserts her own voice as one way to counter the silences surrounding forgotten slaves.

The difficulty of this excavation process is revealed partly in the continued tension between Hartman's interest in slavery and the rejection of this interest on the part of Ghanaians, who are depicted as ostracizing Hartman in a number of instances in the text. In addition, and though she draws from "plantation journals and documents, newspaper accounts, missionary tracts, travel writing ... government reports, et cetera," Hartman recognizes that "these documents are 'not free from barbarism.'" Arguably all of Hartman's work is guided by "the impossibility of fully recovering the experience of the enslaved and the emancipated" from these written accounts, and she reads them "against the grain", knowing that in her use of these "official" records, she runs "the risk of reinforcing the authority of these documents even as I try to use them for contrary purposes".

Hartman introduces the concept of narrative restraint in her article "Venus in Two Acts" to delay an archival impulse to continually register as "a death sentence, a tomb, a display of the violated body". In this article, she returns to the slaver Recovery for an exploration that began in Lose Your Mother. Unable to write about the girl named Venus owing to her brief appearance in the archive, Hartman's attempts to resuscitate possible narratives for her ultimately lead to failure. She explains, "But in the end I was forced to admit that I wanted to console myself and to escape the slave hold with a vision of something other than the bodies of two girls settling on the floor of the Atlantic." Hartman ultimately restrains her desire to imaginatively recreate Venus's final days, her passages in Lose Your Mother only briefly mentioning Venus's fate. Her inclusion in "Venus" of the narratives omitted in Lose Your Mother, with the caveat that such narratives push beyond the boundaries of the archive, leads to the concept of narrative restraint, "the refusal to fill in the gaps and provide closure." While she excavates the historical archive in her attempt to understand the possibilities for subjectivity for the black slave (in Scenes of Subjection), the possibilities for African Diasporic community (in Lose Your Mother), a question she in her article "Venus in Two Acts" serves as a guiding principle and a lesson on archival method: "If it is no longer sufficient to expose the scandal, then how might it be possible to generate a different set of descriptions from this archive?"

For example she quotes John Weskett who opined:
“The insurer takes upon him the risk of loss, capture and death of slaves, or any other unavoidable accident to them; but natural death is always understood to be expected: by natural death is meant, not only when it happens by disease or sickness, but also when the captive destroys himself through despair, which often happens: but when slaves were killed or thrown into the sea in order to quell an insurrection on their part, then the insurers must answer.”

The Promised Lands
Black people in the Diaspora, with no knowledge of a past, try to imagine a past that is nothing like the harsh present entangled with murder, humiliation, and incarceration. Such imaginations include the pre-colonial era of Kings and Queens. Rastafarians envision a sort of replica of such a past into the future with calls of the downfall of Babylon and a return to the Promised Land. Hartman explains: "The heirs of slaves wanted a past of which they could be proud, so they conveniently forgot the distinctions between the rulers and the ruled and closed eyes to slavery in Africa. They pretended that their ancestors had once worn the king's vestments and assumed grand civilization of Asante as their own." This, coupled with a longing for belonging only achievable by escaping the brutality of the West's racism and returning to Africa the homeland, led to disbelief and shock when encountering Ghanaians who favored migrating to the U.S. to escape the impoverishment of the present. Hartman notes: "African Americans entertained fantasies of return and Ghanaians of departure. From where we each were standing, we did not see the same past, nor did we share a common vision of the Promised Land." To the Ghanaians, the Promised Land is America, the images heavily circulated in movies, music videos, and more, that tell one story of wealth and prosperity even for Black Americans.

Wayward Lives, Beautiful Experiments
Hartman's work Wayward Lives, Beautiful Experiments: Intimate Histories of Riotous Black Girls, Troublesome Women, and Queer Radicals (2019) explores the lives of various Black women in Harlem and Philadelphia during the 1890s. Hartman describes the boundaries of Black life and womanhood through both interracial and intra-racial relationships and examines how Black women's sexuality was policed and constructed within an ideology of criminality at the turn of the twentieth century. These "deviant" behaviors are referred to as "wayward" and illustrate how Black women navigate society under surveillance, violence, and partial or conditional citizenship. The social life of Black women under surveillance results in these wayward movements being characterized as "illegal". These movements serve as an act of resistance against not only the state, but the examination of Black life under the guise of policy researchers, sociologists, and reformers aiming to improve Black women in New York and Philadelphia. Hartman asks how to imagine Black womanhood outside of the archive and "the sociological imagination that could only ever recognize her as a problem," invoking Du Bois's famed question in The Souls of Black Folk: "How does it feel to be a problem?" Wayward Lives, Beautiful Experiments: Intimate Histories of Social Upheaval critiques the pathologization of Black women's lives by constructing a social space of freedom and "waywardness" as acts of world-making and possibility.

Wayward Lives, Beautiful Experiments narrates how the state functioned as a criminalizing force through laws and regulations that reproduced logics of chattel slavery and patriarchy (e.g. the Tenement House Act, wayward minor laws and requirements for female performers to apply for a license in order to perform in men's clothing). Figures including Gladys Bentley, an out butch lesbian performer, regularly subverted and challenged written and unwritten laws meant to criminalize sexual and gender expression. In 1952, Bentley published an article in Ebony Magazine detailing her return to womanhood and marriage to a man in part to continue her career as a performer and as a result of the struggles she endured as an out lesbian. Living outside the boundaries of heterosexuality and what passed as woman, if not directly criminalized by the state, was still considered deviant and punishable outside the limited spaces created by and for queer folks.

Hartman also writes about the minor lives that easily slip in the archive into oblivion. Tacked away as uncomfortable facts, they are overshadowed by large figures; white and famous men. Photograph 308 in Thomas Eakins’ photographic collection is of a nude African American girl, posed as Venus. Hartman contemplates on the girl's anonymity, which becomes "a placeholder for all the possibilities and the dangers awaiting young black women in the first decades of the twentieth century. In being denied a name or, perhaps, in refusing to give one, she represents all the other girls who follow in her path. Anonymity enables her to stand in for all the others. The minor figure yields to the chorus. All the hurt and the promise of the wayward are hers to bear." Fred Moten also discusses the photograph in an essay, titled, “Catalogue Number 308 (The Black Apparatus Is a Little Girl),” which is in his book Black and Blur.

It won the 2019 National Book Critics Circle Award (Criticism).

Works 
 Wayward Lives, Beautiful Experiments: Intimate Histories of Riotous Black Girls, Troublesome Women, and Queer Radicals (W. W. Norton & Company, 2019)
 Lose Your Mother: A Journey Along the Atlantic Slave Route (Farrar, Straus and Giroux, 2007)
 Scenes of Subjection: Terror, Slavery, and Self-Making in Nineteenth-Century America (Oxford University Press, 1997)

References

Living people
Columbia University faculty
People from Brooklyn
Wesleyan University alumni
Yale University alumni
African-American historians
Historians of slavery
Literary theorists
1961 births
Historians from New York (state)
21st-century African-American people
MacArthur Fellows
20th-century African-American people
Fellows of the American Academy of Arts and Sciences